Giovanni Battista Zaist (Cremona, June 14, 1700 – September 29, 1757) was an Italian painter and art historian.

Biography
He was a pupil of Giuseppe Natali. Zaist painted for the church of Santi Egidio ed Omobono and the oratory of San Girolamo. In 1736, Bishop Alessandro Litta used his design to build the convents and churches for the Malmaritate and Penitenti. He is likely best known for his biography of Cremonese painters, which was published posthumously.

References

1700 births
1757 deaths
Writers from Cremona
18th-century Italian painters
Italian male painters
Painters from Cremona
Italian Baroque painters
Italian art historians
18th-century Italian male artists